Ustronia is a genus of land snails with an operculum, terrestrial gastropod mollusks in the family Helicinidae.

Species 
Species within the genus Ustronia include:
 Ustronia acuminata (Velazquez in Poey, 1852)
 Ustronia sloanei (d’Orbigny, 1842)

References 

Helicinidae